Arulmigu Murugan Temple, Thiruparankundram is a Tamil temple dedicated to the god Murugan (also known as Kartikeya and Murugan) at Thiruparankundram, Tamilnadu, India. It is regarded as one of the "six Abodes of Murugan". The temple is built in rock-cut architecture and believed to have been built by the Pandyas during the 6th century. According to the legend. it is where Murugan slayed the demon Surapadman and married Deivayanai, the daughter of the king of heaven, Indra. Also, Murugan is said to have worshipped his father Shiva here as Parangirinathar.

In the main shrine, apart from Murugan, the deities Shiva, Vishnu, Vinayaka (Ganesha) and Durga are housed. The temple follows Shaiva tradition of worship. Six daily rituals and three yearly festivals are held at the temple, of which the Kantha Sashti festival during the Tamil month  of Aippasi (October - November) being the most prominent. The temple is maintained and administered by the Hindu Religious and Endowment Board of the Government of Tamil Nadu.

Legend

Thiruparamkundram finds mention in the Kanda Puranam detailing the slaying of Surapadman by the god Murugan. As per Hindu legend, the demon king Surapadman, once obtained boons from the god Shiva on account of severe penance. He started ruling the 1008 worlds on account of the power attained. He married Padumakomalai and had several sons. Viramkendiram, a city created in the seas, became his capital and he started troubling the devas (the gods). He imprisoned Indra (the king of the gods) and also desired Indra's wife Indrani. Indra sought the help of Shiva's son and the god of war Murugan. Murugan sent his messenger Viravakutevar to the demon, who remained unmoved. A severe battle was fought in Thiruparamkundram where Murugan killed all the sons of the Surapadman except Iraniyan. Surapadman hid under the sea. Murugan split him into two pieces, which went on to become the god's divine vehicles, peacock and rooster. The day when Murugan slayed Surapadman is celebrated as Skanda Sashti festival in all the Murugan temples.

In gratitude, Indra married his daughter Deivayanai to Murugan at Thiruparamkundram. Murugan is believed to have worshipped Shiva here as Parangirinathar. Kanthar Anoobothi, a treatise of the divine marriage records that Murugan asked all the divine angels and gods who attended the marriage to fly back to heaven in their own vehicles in Mano veham (speed of thought).

History

Inscriptional evidences point out that this temple, being carved out of a hill, was most probably earlier a Jain cave. There is another theory that earlier to this, the Murugan temple existed much before the 6th century and converted into Jain shrine by Jain monks under the aegis of Pandya king Koon Pandiyan. The temple was later converted into a Hindu temple under the tutelage of Gajapathy, the minister of a later Pandya King, during the later part of the 8th century. The temple has several additions during the regime of Madurai Nayaks who commissioned the pillared halls in the temple. As of 2021, the temple is maintained and administered by the Hindu Religious and Charitable Endowments Department of the Government of Tamil Nadu.

Architecture

The temple is built rock-cut architecture dating back to the Pandya period of 6th century and the life sized sculptures in the mandapas of the Nayaka period during the 16th century. The granite hill behind the temple is  has a shrine of Kasi Viswanatha (Shiva) at the top. The image of Vinayaka (Ganesha) in the temple holds sugarcane and fruits. The inner rock cut image is made from a single stone.

The Kambathadi Mandapam, Ardha Mandapam, and Mahamandapam, the three halls leading to the sanctum, are situated at varying elevation. The main shrine is an early rock cut temple which has cells that house the sanctums of Murugan, Durga, Vinayaka, Shiva and Vishnu. All the statues are carved on the wall of the parankundram rock. Shiva is worshipped as Parangirinathar with his wife  Parvati as Aavudai Nayaki. Panels depicting Shiva's dance of bliss are seen outside the sanctum.

A notable feature of this temple is that the Shiva and Vishnu face each other in the main shrine, considered a rare thing in ancient Hindu temples. Outside the temple there is a water tank, where the fishes are served with salt and rice flakes by the devotees. There is also a Vedic school on the banks of the temple pond. In front of the Dwajasthambam, the flag staff, there is a carved Nandi (bull), Mayil (peacock) and mouse, the Vahanas (vehicles) of Shiva, Murugan and Vinayaka. There is a flight of six steps called the "Shadashara Padigal", before Ardha Mandapam. The rock carvings of Mahisshasura Mardini (Durga), Karpaga Vinayagar (Ganesha), Andarabaranar and Uggirar are seen in the hall. There are five water bodies, namely, Saravana Poigai, Lakshmi Theertham, Saniyasi Kinaru (well), Kasi Sunai, and Sathiya Koopam.

Literary mention 
The 7th-century Shaiva saint Sambandar visited Thirupparamkunram and praised the Shiva icon of the temple Uchinathar in ten verses in Tevaram, compiled as the First Tirumurai. As the temple is revered in Tevaram, it is classified as Paadal Petra Sthalam, one of the 276 temples that find mention in the Saiva canon. The temple is counted as the third in the series of the temples on bank of river Vaigai.

Sambandar met the three Tamil chiefs, the Chera, the Chola and the Pandya in this temple and blessed them. Sundarar and Sambandar composed the Tevaram Pathigam here. Nakkirar composed many poems on the Murugan icon. Tiruppugazh, Kandapuranam and other works speak of the glory of this shrine.

Religious importance and festivals

The temple priests daily perform the puja (rituals). The temple rituals are performed three times a day; Kalasanthi at 8:00 a.m., Uchikalam at 12:00 a.m. and Sayarakshai at 6:00 p.m. Each ritual comprises four steps: abhisheka (sacred bath), alangaram (decoration), naivethanam (food offering) and deepa aradanai (waving of lamps) for Uchinathar (Shiva) and Uchinayagi (Parvati).

Skanda Shashti festival celebrated during the Tamil month of Aippasi (October - November) is the most prominent festival of the temple. Murugan killing Surapadman is enacted during the last of the six days and the festive image of Murugan is taken in different mounts around the streets of the temple during the festival. Brahmotsavam here falls in the Tamil month of Panguni. The Vishnu named Pavalakanivai Perumal, and Murugan are taken in procession to Madurai to celebrate Minakshi's wedding (Chittirai festival), with residents of Madurai dressed in festive clothing. Nakkirar's association with this temple is also celebrated as a festival. Karthigai Deepam festival is also celebrated during the Tamil month of Karthigai by lighting a lamp on top of the hill. Vaikasi Visakam, and the float festival in Thai(Tamil month) are the other festivals celebrated in the temple. Since the image of Vishnu is in the temple, Vaikunta Ekadashi is also celebrated.

References

External links

 Photo gallery of Thirupparamkunram Murugan Temple

Hindu temples in Madurai district
Hindu temples in Madurai
Religious buildings and structures in Madurai
Buildings and structures in Madurai
Murugan temples in Tamil Nadu
Kaumaram